Poca High School, originally named "Pocatalico District High School", is a high school in Poca, West Virginia, United States.  It serves the easternmost portion of Putnam County and is a part of the Putnam County Schools.

The school is rated as having 601 students for athletic purposes, placing it in class AA.  The school colors are red and grey. Pocatalico is a Native American word meaning "river of fat deer." Its original mascot was an American Indian riding upon a white horse. "Legend" passed down through the years tells of a Native American, Pocatalico, who was killed at the mouth of the Pocatalico River.   The current nickname, thought to be unique in the nation and for which the school is mildly famous, is the "Dots", and has been featured by ESPN and Sports Illustrated in several lists of best school mascots.  "The Dot" mascot was first referenced in 1928, during a storming football game when a reporter exclaimed, "they look like a bunch of red polka dots running around the field!"  The name stuck and is still currently used.

History
Poca High School first opened its doors in September, 1922 using a small white schoolhouse located on a hillside between Bancroft and Black Betsy, West Virginia. The school then moved to a much larger building overlooking Poca's Main Street in 1926. In 1970, the school relocated to its current building on the outskirts of town.  Over the next decade, Poca High School's then-modern 1970 design was replicated to build new buildings for Hurricane and Winfield High Schools, also located in Putnam County. Thus, while subsequent renovations and additions over the years have introduced unique character, the core sections of three of Putnam County's four high schools share nearly-identical floor plans. Poca High School itself received significant renovation and addition in 2011-2012.  Following the high school's move to its current building, the former 1926-era building was used as Poca Junior High (later Middle) School from 1970 until 2012; that building was demolished in 2013 after construction of a new building for the middle school.

The first graduating class consisted of eleven students. The first school paper, The School Echo, was published in January, 1924. Three years later, the first annual yearbook, The Pocatalico, was published. Since then, there has been an issue of The Pocatalico released every year.

Arts and athletics
Poca High School is known for fielding highly competitive athletic teams and music ensembles (including marching band and show choir) which have earned the school multiple awards, championships, and recognition on the state, regional, and national stages.

References

External links
 Poca High School website
 Poca High School music
 Putnam County Schools

Public high schools in West Virginia
Buildings and structures in Putnam County, West Virginia
Education in Putnam County, West Virginia
Schools in Putnam County, West Virginia
1922 establishments in West Virginia